Norton High School is a public high school in Norton, Ohio, United States, and the only high school in the Norton City School District. Athletic teams are known as the Panthers with school colors of red and white (also can be black). They are one of the 8 schools who compete in the Metro Athletic Conference. The  building opened in January 2017, replacing the previous home of Norton High School, built in 1953. The former high school building was re-purposed as Norton Middle School. The campus includes athletic fields and a multi-purpose stadium, which opened in September 2015. The stadium has an artificial surface for football and soccer and an eight-lane all-weather track.

State championships 

 Boys Golf – 1964 
 Boys Shot Put - 1998
 Girls  Shot Put - 2021

References

External links

High schools in Summit County, Ohio
Public high schools in Ohio
1953 establishments in Ohio